Stephen James "Steve" Batchelor (born 22 June 1961) is an English former field hockey player.

International career
Batchelor was a member of the gold winning Great Britain squad in the 1988 Summer Olympics in Seoul, setting up Imran Sherwani in the final against West-Germany. Four years earlier he won Bronze at the 1984 Olympics in Los Angeles. He also won silver with the England squad at the 1986 Hockey World Cup. Batchelor played international hockey for twelve years before retiring after the 1992 Summer Olympics.

Club career
Batchelor has played club hockey for Southgate Hockey Club and East Grinstead.

Personal life
Batchelor was born in Beare Green, Surrey. He is head of admissions at Cranleigh School, and coaches the U14 boys and girls hockey teams. He lives in Cranleigh with his four children, including Meg Batchelor International Professional Hockey Star and wife Jackie-Bae.

References

External links
 
 

1961 births
Living people
English male field hockey players
English Olympic medallists
Olympic gold medallists for Great Britain
Olympic bronze medallists for Great Britain
Olympic field hockey players of Great Britain
British male field hockey players
Field hockey players at the 1984 Summer Olympics
Field hockey players at the 1988 Summer Olympics
Field hockey players at the 1992 Summer Olympics
People from Surrey
People educated at Millfield
Medalists at the 1988 Summer Olympics
Medalists at the 1984 Summer Olympics
East Grinstead Hockey Club players
Southgate Hockey Club players
Olympic medalists in field hockey